Butte County is a county located in the northern part of the U.S. state of California. In the 2020 census, its population was 211,632. The county seat is Oroville.

Butte County comprises the Chico, CA metropolitan statistical area. It is in the California Central Valley, north of the state capital of Sacramento. 

Butte County is drained by the Feather River and the Sacramento River. Butte Creek and Big Chico Creek are additional perennial streams, both tributary to the Sacramento. The county is home to California State University, Chico and Butte College.

History
Butte County is named for the Sutter Buttes in neighboring Sutter County; butte means "small knoll" or "small hill" in French. Butte County was incorporated as one of California's 19 original counties on February 18, 1850. The county went across the present limits of the Tehama, Plumas, Colusa, and Sutter Counties.

Between November 8 and 25, 2018, a major wildfire, the Camp Fire, destroyed most of the town of Paradise, the adjacent community of Concow, and a large area of rural, hilly country east of Chico. More than 80 people were killed, 50,000 were displaced, over 150,000 acres were burned, and nearly 20,000 buildings were destroyed. The Camp Fire was California's most destructive and deadliest fire.

Geography

The county is drained by the Feather River and Butte Creek. Part of the county's western border is formed by the Sacramento River. The county lies along the western slope of the Sierra Nevada, the steep slopes making it prime territory for the siting of hydroelectric power plants. About a half dozen of these plants are located in the county, one of which, serves the Oroville Dam, which became severely stressed by overflow water in 2017, and which remains a concern today.

National protected areas
 Butte Sink National Wildlife Refuge (part)
 Lassen National Forest (part)
 Plumas National Forest (part)
 Sacramento River National Wildlife Refuge (part)

Adjacent counties
Sutter County, California – south
Colusa County, California – southwest
Glenn County, California – west
Tehama County, California – northwest
Plumas County, California – northeast
Yuba County, California – southeast

Demographics

2020 census

Note: the US Census treats Hispanic/Latino as an ethnic category. This table excludes Latinos from the racial categories and assigns them to a separate category. Hispanics/Latinos can be of any race.

2011

Places by population, race, and income

2010 Census
The 2010 United States Census reported that Butte County had a population of 220,000. The racial makeup of Butte County was 180,096 (81.9%) White, 3,415 (1.6%) African American, 4,395 (2.0%) Native American, 9,057 (4.1%) Asian, 452 (0.2%) Pacific Islander, 12,141 (5.5%) from other races, and 10,444 (4.7%) from two or more races. Hispanics or Latinos of any race were 31,116 persons (14.1%).

2000
As of the census of 2000, there were 203,171 people, 79,566 households, and 49,410 families residing in the county. The population density was 124 people per square mile (48/km2). There were 85,523 housing units at an average density of 52 per square mile (20/km2). The racial makeup of the county was 84.5% White, 10.5% of the population were Hispanic or Latino, 3.3% Asian, 1.9% Native American, 1.4% Black or African American, 0.2% Pacific Islander, 4.8% from other races, and 3.9% from two or more races. 87.9% spoke English, 7.8% Spanish and 1.4% Hmong as their first language.

There were 79,566 households, out of which 28.4% had children under the age of 18 living with them, 46.7% were married couples living together, 11.2% had a female householder with no husband present, and 37.9% were non-families. 27.2% of all households were made up of individuals, and 11.1% had someone living alone who was 65 years of age or older. The average household size was 2.48 and the average family size was 3.02.

In the county, the population was spread out, with 24.0% under the age of 18, 13.6% from 18 to 24, 24.8% from 25 to 44, 21.8% from 45 to 64, and 15.8% who were 65 years of age or older. The median age was 36 years. For every 100 females there were 96.1 males. For every 100 females age 18 and over, there were 92.6 males.

The median income for a household in the county was $31,924, and the median income for a family was $41,010. Males had a median income of $34,137 versus $25,393 for females. The per capita income for the county was $17,517. About 12.2% of families and 19.8% of the population were below the poverty line, including 23.8% of those under age 18 and 7.3% of those age 65 or over.

Health and crime 
There are four major hospitals and the State of California defines Butte County as being inside Health Service Area 1. A special district, the Butte County Air Quality Management District, regulates airborne pollutant emissions in the county. It does this following regional regulations, state, and federal laws. For example, in recent years, the agency changed rules that once allowed residents to burn household trash outdoors.

The following table includes the number of incidents reported and the rate per 1,000 persons for each type of offense.

Cities by population and crime rates

Government

Law enforcement 

The Butte County Sheriff's Office provides general-service law enforcement to unincorporated areas of Butte County, serving as the equivalent of the county police for unincorporated areas of the county as well as incorporated cities within the county who have contracted with the agency for law-enforcement services (known as "contract cities" in local jargon). It also holds primary jurisdiction over facilities operated by Butte County, such as local parks, marinas and government buildings; provides marshal service for the Superior Court of Butte County; operates the county jail system; and provides services such as laboratories and academy training to smaller law enforcement agencies within the county. The first sheriff of Butte County was Joseph Q. Wilbur. Kory Honea has been the sheriff since 2014.

Voter registration statistics

Cities by population and voter registration

Local
The citizens of the county of Butte are represented by the five member Butte County Board of Supervisors.

Tribal
The Berry Creek Rancheria of Tyme Maidu Indians of California is headquartered in Oroville. The Berry Creek Rancheria operates Gold Country Casino.

The Mooretown Rancheria of Maidu Indians of California is also headquartered in Oroville. The Mooretown Rancheria operates Feather Falls Casino.

The governmental headquarters of the Mechoopda Indian Tribe of Chico Rancheria is located in Chico.

State 

According to the California Secretary of State, as of February 10, 2019, Butte County has 172,054 registered voters. Of those, 42,093 (34.4%) are registered Democrats, 41,330 (33.8%) are registered Republicans and 30,377 (24.8%) have declined to state a political party.

On November 4, 2008, Butte County voted 56.7% for Proposition 8 which amended the California Constitution to ban same-sex marriages.

Federal

Butte is a bellwether county in presidential elections, and one of only thirteen to have voted for Obama in 2008, Romney in 2012, Trump in 2016, and Biden in 2020.

Education

Public schools
There are roughly 90 public schools in the county according to the National Center for Educational Statistics. The schools are operated by the County Office of Education and 15 school districts, which are:

 Bangor Union Elementary School District
 Biggs Unified School District
 Chico Unified School District
 Durham Unified School District
 Feather Falls Union Elementary School District
 Golden Feather Union Elementary School District
 Gridley Unified School District
 Manzanita Elementary School District
 Oroville City Elementary School District
 Oroville Union High School District
 Palermo Union School District
 Paradise Unified School District
 Pioneer Union Elementary School District
 Thermalito Union School District

Colleges and universities
Butte College
California State University, Chico

Public libraries
Butte County Library provides library services to residents of the County through six branches in Biggs, Chico, Durham, Gridley, Oroville and Paradise. The mission of the Butte County Library is to provide all individuals, regardless of age, ethnic background, educational or economic level, with free access to ideas, information, and technology.

For many years, the library served rural and mountain communities through regularly scheduled bookmobile visits; however, due to budget cuts, this service was discontinued in 2009 and the bookmobile was sold. The library serves low-literacy adults through several programs of the Butte County Library Literacy Services division, including the Adult Reading Program, Families for Literacy and the Literacy Coach, a  vehicle that provides mobile programming like story times, parent meetings, workshops, and computer and teacher trainings.

The library operates as a department of the County of Butte, governed by the Butte County Board of Supervisors.

Transportation

Major highways
 State Route 32
 State Route 70
 State Route 99
 State Route 149
 State Route 162
 State Route 191

Public transportation
Butte Regional Transit or the B-Line, provides service in and between Chico, Oroville, Paradise, Gridley and Biggs. Chico is also a connection point for Glenn Ride buses to Glenn County and Plumas Transit Systems buses to Plumas County.

Greyhound buses stop in Chico.

Amtrak's Coast Starlight (Los Angeles-Seattle) passenger train makes a stop daily in each direction in Chico's Chico station.

Airports
General Aviation airports in Butte County include:
Chico Municipal Airport
Oroville Municipal Airport
Paradise Airport
Ranchaero Airport
Richvale Airport

Communities

Cities

Biggs
Chico
Gridley
Oroville (county seat)

Towns

Paradise

Census-designated places

Bangor
Berry Creek
Butte Creek Canyon
Butte Meadows
Butte Valley
Cherokee
Clipper Mills
Cohasset
Concow
Durham
Forbestown
Forest Ranch
Honcut
Kelly Ridge
Magalia
Nord
Oroville East
Palermo
Rackerby
Richvale
Robinson Mill
South Oroville
Stirling City
Thermalito
Yankee Hill

Unincorporated communities
Centerville
DeSabla
Helltown
Inskip
Irish Town
Lomo
Lovelock
Mineral Slide
Powellton

Former townships

In August 1851, the county was divided into six judicial (civil) townships, the four marked by asterisks below, plus Quartz and Mineral, which were separated from Butte County with the formation of Plumas County in 1854.

Between 1851 and 1861, there were several additions and other realignments of the township boundaries; from 1861, the townships were:

 Bidwell
 Chico
 Concow
 Hamilton*
 Kimshew
 Mountain Spring
 Ophir*
 Oregon*
 Oro*
 Wyandotte

Townships created and dissolved between 1851 and 1861 were Benton, Eureka, and Cascade.

Ghost towns
Bidwell's Bar – now located under Lake Oroville
Butte Creek
Coutolenc
Diamondville
Forks of Butte – a former gold mining settlement
Hamilton - Butte County's first permanent county seat, John Bidwell discovered gold at Hamilton in 1848, and the settlement arose.
Lynchburg

Population ranking

The population ranking of the following table is based on the 2010 census of Butte County.

† county seat

In popular culture
Several movies have been filmed in Butte County, including Gone with the Wind, The Outlaw Josey Wales, Friendly Persuasion, Magic Town, The Klansman, Ruby Ridge: An American Tragedy, The Adventures of Robin Hood, and Under Wraps. A 2013 episode of the television series Sons of Anarchy involves the sons coming into contact with corrupt police in the fictional town of Eden, located in Butte County.

See also 
List of California counties
List of school districts in Butte County, California
 List of museums in the Shasta Cascade (California)
National Register of Historic Places listings in Butte County, California

Notes 
Notes

References

References

External links

Butte County Association of Governments

 

 
California counties
Sacramento Valley
Shasta Cascade
1850 establishments in California
Populated places established in 1850